Eldridge Park, located in Elmira, New York, is a famous amusement park, which opened around the turn of the 20th century.

The park includes an 1890s Looff Carousel, an outdoor stage, an extensive network of picnic areas, a wooden roller coaster, haunted house, shooting gallery, bumper cars, a boat ride along the park's lake, eateries, a miniature golf course, and a small-gauge train ride through the park, in addition to several other rides and attractions.

Eldridge Lake was believed to be bottomless in local folklore and, that there was an underground water tunnel that leads at least  to the north, to Seneca Lake, one of the nearby Finger Lakes in Upstate New York.

Eldridge Park also has several soccer fields, used by the local travel soccer club, Soaring Capital Soccer Club, a skate park, and a baseball field.

History
A pharmacist, Dr. Edwin Eldridge, purchased the land where the park is today and built a sculpture garden. The city of Elmira later bought the land in 1889, after Eldridge died.

Attractions

Looff Carousel
One of the most iconic features of the park is the restored 1890s Looff Carousel which was originally built in the late 1890s and operated by Young’s Million Dollar Pier in Atlantic City, New Jersey. The carousel, measuring 50 feet in diameter with three rows of stationary animals, was purchased by Robert A. Long and moved to Eldridge Park in 1924. Long altered the carousel somewhat, re-carved some animals, and converted the stationary animals to jumping figures. Long's family operated the carousel until 1988, by which time the ride had deteriorated badly and the hand-carved wooden animals were sold at auction in 1989. The carousel mechanism was not sold, and instead was donated to the City of Elmira.

In the early 2000s, the Carousel Preservation Society was formed with the goal of acquiring hand-carved animals and restoring the carousel. On May 26, 2006, the restored Eldridge Park Carousel was re-opened to the public.

The current version of the Eldridge Park carousel boasts 56 hand-carved animals and two dragon benches. It is thought to be the fastest carousel in the United States, moving at 11.5 miles per hour and is one of the few remaining carousels in the United States to have brass ring feeders.

Other park amenities
Between 2003 and 2006, many amenities were added including entrances, a gift shop, a stage, restrooms, park benches, and fountains. In 2007, the former whip building was converted into a dance hall. In 2008 Jasper II, a boat ride around the lake, was introduced, along with a new old fashioned arcade.

Dragon paddle boats, were introduced on Memorial Day weekend 2009. A concessions building was also added.

In 2010, a new Mark Twain themed miniature golf course opened.  The course has a traditional eighteen holes, as well as scenery including fountains, ponds, stones, flowers, and a waterfall. A miniature train ride was also built to circle around the course. In 2012, the Thunderbird Flying Scooters returned to the park. While they no longer fly over Eldridge Lake, they remain an extremely popular ride.

The opening of the park for the 2013 season saw a complete redesign for the Eldridge Midway. Instead of pot holed blacktop, cement pavers, gardening, and Victorian style lights were debuted. Along with a brand new midway, the park saw the return of the children's Pony Cart ride and the opening of several different food vendors.

For the 2016 season, the park announced the addition of two attractions, a boat ride and a statue that pays tribute to the racehorse American Girl that died at Elmira Racetrack in 1875. The park also announced an opening ceremony for the special opening of a record two attractions. The ceremony took place on May 27.

References

External links

Defunct amusement parks in New York (state)
1926 establishments in New York (state)